Al Ameen School  is a British School located in Al Ghusais, Dubai, UAE. It is a private profit-making school. It has presently 500 students enrolled.

KHDA Inspection Report
The Knowledge and Human Development Authority (KHDA) is an educational quality assurance authority based in Dubai, United Arab Emirates. It undertakes early learning, school and higher learning institution management and rates them as well.

A summary of the inspection ratings for Al Ameen School.

A summary of all the schools in Dubai's ratings can be found at KHDA School Ratings.

References

External links
School Website http://www.msbdubai.com/

Schools in Dubai
Educational institutions established in 1985
1985 establishments in the United Arab Emirates